Occasional use of body fluids such as blood, urine, feces, etc. in works of art is most common in shock art or transgressive art.

Examples

Blood 

 New York artist Vincent Castiglia uses his own blood to make paintings, and used it to make the artwork on the guitar of thrash metal musician Gary Holt.
 The Anguished Man, an allegedly haunted painting by an unknown artist, contains the artist's blood in its paint, according its owner.
 The Flaming Lips released a limited run of vinyl records of the 2012 album Heady Fwends containing the blood of the musicians involved, sold for $2,500 each.

Urine 

 Piss Christ, a controversial 1987 photograph by American photographer Andres Serrano, depicts a small plastic crucifix submerged in a small glass tank full of the artist's urine.

 PISSED, a glass tube containing 200 gallons of the urine of Canadian transgender artist Cassils, was made in 2017 as a protest against a decision by the Trump administration to revoke an Obama administration executive order which guaranteed that transgender students could use restrooms that corresponded with their gender identity. It is currently on exhibition at the Leslie-Lohman Museum of Art.

Feces 

 Artist's Shit, a 1961 artwork by Italian artist Piero Manzoni, consists of 90 tin cans reportedly filled with 30 grams (1.1 oz) of his feces.

Criticism and difficulties 
Depicting objects of popular respect (religious subjects, flags, etc.) in art which includes body fluids can trigger public protests due to such material's historic association with dirtiness. The outcry about the Piss Christ photo is an example.

In addition to the obvious difficulties of preserving perishable material, there can be regulations complicating transport by rail, truck, or aircraft of liquid body fluids due to the fluids' possible classification as dangerous goods.

The sale of blood art via eBay is prohibited as eBay prohibits the sale of body parts, and classifies blood art as falling under this heading.

See also
New materials in 20th-century art
Urine in art

References

Visual arts materials